The 1999–2000 season is MC Alger's 32nd season in the Algerian top flight, They will be competing in National 1, the Algerian Cup, the Algerian League Cup and the CAF Champions League.

Squad list
Players and squad numbers last updated on 1 September 1999.Note: Flags indicate national team as has been defined under FIFA eligibility rules. Players may hold more than one non-FIFA nationality.

Competitions

Overview

{| class="wikitable" style="text-align: center"
|-
!rowspan=2|Competition
!colspan=8|Record
!rowspan=2|Started round
!rowspan=2|Final position / round
!rowspan=2|First match	
!rowspan=2|Last match
|-
!
!
!
!
!
!
!
!
|-
| National

|  
| 11st
| 14 October 1999
| 29 June 2000
|-
| Algerian Cup

| Round of 64
| Round of 32
| 2 March 2000
| 1 May 2000
|-
| League Cup

| Group stage
| Round of 16
| 23 December 1999
| 10 February 2000
|-
| Champions League

| colspan=2|First round
| 18 March 2000
| 1 April 2000
|-
! Total

National

League table

Results summary

Results by round

Matches

Algerian Cup

Algerian League Cup

Group stage

Knockout stage

CAF Champions League

First round

Squad information

Playing statistics

|-

|-
! colspan=14 style=background:#dcdcdc; text-align:center| Players transferred out during the season

Goalscorers
Includes all competitive matches. The list is sorted alphabetically by surname when total goals are equal.

Transfers

In

Out

Notes

References

External links
 1999–2000 MC Alger season at sebbar.kazeo.com 

MC Alger seasons
MC Alger